Meadowlark are a British indie pop duo composed of Kate McGill and Daniel Broadley.

Biography

Meadowlark were initially a trio made up of McGill, Broadley, and Carl Jones. McGill, who had until that point been known for her covers of popular songs, which she posted on her YouTube channel, announced the formation of the band on 22 March 2013. On the same day, they released a live version of a track titled "Family Tree", which focuses on Kate's home life. Meadowlark released their first EP, Three Six Five, on 26 May 2014. In September of that year, it was announced on social media that Carl Jones would no longer be part of the band, signifying a fresh start. Kate and Daniel released their first EP as a duo, named Dual, on 30 March 2015. Their single "Eyes Wide" gained popularity through the radio show BBC Music Introducing, and they performed at Glastonbury Festival on the BBC Introducing stage later that year. In 2016, Meadowlark released the Paraffin EP, followed by two singles, "Quicksand" and "Headlights". Their debut album, Postcards, came out on 30 June 2017. On 26 November 2021, the duo released their sophomore album, titled Nightstorm.

Discography
Studio albums
 Postcards (2017)
 Nightstorm (2021)

EPs
 Three Six Five (2014)
 Dual (2015)
 Dual (Remixes) (2015)
 Paraffin (2016)
 Nocturnes (2017)
 Sunlight (2017)
 H.I.T.H. (Remixes) (2019)

Singles
 "Family Tree" (2013)
 "Quicksand" (2016)
 "Headlights" (2016)
 "May I Have This Dance" (2017)
 "Pink Heart" (2018)
 "Appetite" (2018)
 "H.I.T.H." (2019)
 "Still Into You" (2019)
 "Halo" (2020)
 "Lightning" (2020)
 "My Light Has Gone" (2021)

References

External links
 
 

Musical groups established in 2013
2013 establishments in England
British indie pop groups
British musical duos
Dream pop musical groups